This is a list of U.S. state representatives.  This list contains the names of U.S. state representatives in the 25 states, listed alphabetically, from Montana to Wyoming.  For the remaining 25 states, please see List of U.S. state representatives (Alabama to Missouri).

Summary

Superlatives 

From the 50 state legislatures in the United States, the following superlatives emerge:

 Largest legislature: New Hampshire General Court (424 members)
 Smallest legislature: Nebraska Legislature (49 members)
 Largest upper house: Minnesota Senate (67 senators)
 Smallest upper house: Alaska Senate (20 senators)
 Largest lower house: New Hampshire House of Representatives (400 representatives)
 Smallest lower house: Alaska House of Representatives (40 representatives)

There are a total of 5,411 state representatives nationwide, with the average state house having 110 members

Terminology for lower houses 

The 49 lower houses of state legislatures in the United States  Nebraska lacks a lower house  have various names:

 House of Representatives: 41 states;
 State Assembly: 4 states (California, Nevada, New York, and Wisconsin);
 House of Delegates: 3 states (Maryland, Virginia, and West Virginia); and
 General Assembly: 1 state (New Jersey).

Montana

Nebraska 

Nebraska is the only state in the United States with a unicameral legislature.  When Nebraska switched to a unicameral legislature in 1937, the lower house (the Nebraska House of Representatives) was abolished. All current Nebraskan legislators are referred to as "senators", as the pre-1937 upper house, the Nebraska Senate, was the retained house.  Currently, the state's legislature is formally known as the Nebraska Legislature and is often referred to as "the Unicameral".  (See Members of the Nebraska Legislature.)

Nevada

New Hampshire

New Jersey

New Mexico

New York

North Carolina

North Dakota

Ohio

Oklahoma

Oregon

Pennsylvania

Rhode Island

South Carolina

South Dakota

Tennessee

Texas

Utah

Vermont

Virginia

Washington

West Virginia

Wisconsin

Wyoming

See also 

 List of United States state legislatures
 List of U.S. state representatives (Alabama to Missouri)
 List of U.S. state senators

References

Legislatures-related lists
Montana
Representatives